Bowden Island is one of the southern islands of the Family Islandsgroup and located approximately 20 km East of Tully Heads.

The Aboriginal name for this island is Budg-Joo Island.

The GBRMPA has deemed this island a Sensitive Location and limited visits to 2 per week.

Islands on the Great Barrier Reef
Islands of Far North Queensland
Uninhabited islands of Australia